Robert de Saint-Clair, Lord of Saint-Clair, Châteauneuf and Sorel, was a French nobleman.

Robert married Eleanor de Dreux, widow of Hugues IV de Châteauneuf, she was the daughter of Robert II, Count of Dreux and Yolande de Coucy. They had a son Robert. Eleanor died in 1248.

He remarried Isabelle de Maillebois, lady of Courville. Robert became Lord of Châteauneuf and Sorel in 1253 after the death of Jean de Châteauneuf, Eleanor's son from her previous marriage.

Robert died around 1269. Isabelle remarried in 1270, Geoffroy de Rochefort.

Robert's son, known as Robert the Younger, died in 1260 without issue.

Notes

References

Further reading
Robert Saint-Clair - Foundation for Medieval Genealogy - Medieval Lands Index

1269 deaths